The 1996 Boston Red Sox season was the 96th season in the franchise's Major League Baseball history. The Red Sox finished third in the American League East with a record of 85 wins and 77 losses, seven games behind the New York Yankees, who went on to win the 1996 World Series.

Offseason 
 October 13, 1995: Butch Henry was selected off waivers by the Red Sox from the Montreal Expos.
 December 14, 1995: Mike Stanley was signed as a free agent by the Red Sox.
 December 21, 1995: Milt Cuyler was signed as a free agent by the Red Sox.
 December 21, 1995: Tom Gordon was signed as a free agent by the Red Sox.
 January 2, 1996: Jamie Moyer was signed as a free agent by the Red Sox.
 January 10, 1996: Traded Rhéal Cormier, Ryan McGuire, and Shayne Bennett to the Montreal Expos for Wil Cordero and Bryan Eversgerd.
 January 21, 1996: Dan Monzon, supervisor of Latin American scouting, was killed in an automobile accident in the Dominican Republic.
 January 22, 1996: Alex Cole was signed as a free agent by the Red Sox.
 January 29, 1996: Glenn Murray, Ken Ryan, and Lee Tinsley were traded by the Red Sox to the Philadelphia Phillies for Heathcliff Slocumb, Larry Wimberly (minors) and Rick Holyfield (minors).
 March 8, 1996: Kevin Mitchell was signed as a free agent by the Red Sox.
 March 19, 1996: Luis Alicea was selected off waivers by the St. Louis Cardinals.

Regular season 
 September 18, 1996: Roger Clemens struck out 20 batters for the second time in his career, becoming the only player ever to do so. The performance came against the Detroit Tigers at Tiger Stadium. Clemens' second 20-K day occurred in his second-to-last game as a member of the Boston Red Sox.

Season standings

Record vs. opponents

Detailed records

Notable transactions 
 April 18, 1996: Bryan Eversgerd was traded by Red Sox to the Texas Rangers for a player to be named later. The Rangers completed the deal by sending Rudy Pemberton on April 24.
 May 17, 1996: Brad Pennington was selected off of waivers from the California Angels.
 June 5, 1996: Jeff Frye was signed as a free agent.
 June 9, 1996: Traded Scott Backum to the Philadelphia Phillies for Lee Tinsley.
 July 30, 1996: Kevin Mitchell was traded by the Red Sox to the Cincinnati Reds for Roberto Mejía and Brad Tweedie (minors).
 July 30, 1996: Jamie Moyer was traded by the Red Sox to the Seattle Mariners for Darren Bragg.
 July 31, 1996: Mike Stanton and a player to be named later were traded by the Red Sox to the Texas Rangers for Mark Brandenburg and Kerry Lacy. The Red Sox completed the deal by sending Dwayne Hosey to the Rangers on November 4.
 August 1, 1996: Greg Pirkl was selected off waivers by the Red Sox from the Seattle Mariners.
 August 26, 1996: Traded for a player to be named later to the Minnesota Twins for Pat Mahomes. Brian Looney was sent to the Twins on December 17 to complete the deal.

Draft picks 
 June 4, 1996: 1996 Major League Baseball Draft
 Chris Reitsma was drafted by the Red Sox in the 1st round. Player signed June 22, 1996.
 Dernell Stenson was drafted by the Red Sox in the 2nd round. Player signed July 12, 1996.
 Robert Ramsay was drafted by the Red Sox in the 7th round. Player signed June 15, 1996.
 Justin Duchscherer was drafted by the Red Sox in the 8th round. Player signed June 14, 1996.
 Shea Hillenbrand was drafted by the Red Sox in the 10th round. Player signed June 6, 1996.
 Aaron Harang was drafted by the Red Sox in the 22nd round, but did not sign.

Opening Day Line Up

Roster

Player stats

Batting

Starters by position 
Note: Pos = Position; G = Games played; AB = At bats; H = Hits; Avg. = Batting average; HR = Home runs; RBI = Runs batted in; SB = Stolen bases

Other batters 
Note: G = Games played; AB = At bats; H = Hits; Avg. = Batting average; HR = Home runs; RBI = Runs batted in; SB = Stolen bases

Pitching 
Note: G = Games pitched; GS = Games started; IP = Innings pitched; W = Wins; L = Losses; SV = Saves; ERA = Earned run average; SO = Strikeouts

Game log 

|- style="text-align:center; background-color:#fbb;"
| 1 || April 1 || @ Rangers  || 3–5 || Hill (1–0) || Clemens (0–1) || Vosberg (1) || The Ballpark in Arlington || 40,484 || 0–1 || L1
|- style="text-align:center; background-color:#fbb;"
| 2 || April 3 || @ Rangers  || 2–7 || Pavlik (1–0) || Gordon (0–1) || — || The Ballpark in Arlington || 24,483  || 0–2 || L2
|- style="text-align:center; background-color:#fbb;"
| 3 || April 4 || @ Rangers  || 2–13 || Gross (1–0)  || Wakefield (0–1) || — || The Ballpark in Arlington || 18,086 || 0–3 || L3
|- style="text-align:center; background-color:#fbb;"
| 4 || April 5 || @ Royals  || 4–5 (12)|| Clark (1–0)  || Pennington (0–1)  || — || Kauffman Stadium || 39,526 || 0–4 || L4
|- style="text-align:center; background-color:#fbb;"
| 5 || April 6 || @ Royals || 3–7 || Pichardo (1–1) || Belinda (0–1) || — || Kauffman Stadium || 17,339 || 0–5 || L5
|- style="text-align:center; background-color:#bfb;"
| 6 || April 7 || @ Royals  || 3–1 || Moyer (1–0) || Gubicza (0–1) || Slocumb (1) || Kauffman Stadium || 13,183 || 1–5 || W1
|- style="text-align:center; background-color:#bbb"
| — || April 8 || Twins  || colspan=8|Postponed (snow). Makeup date April 9.
|- style="text-align:center; background-color:#bfb;"
| 7 || April 9 || Twins  || 9–1  || Gordon (1–1) || Rodriguez (0–1) || — || Fenway Park || 30,843 || 2–5 || W2
|- style="text-align:center; background-color:#bbb"
| — || April 10 || Twins  || colspan=8|Postponed (snow). Makeup date August 3.
|- style="text-align:center; background-color:#fbb"
| 8 || April 11 || Twins || 5–6 || Radke (3–0) || Clemens (0–2) || Stevens (2) || Fenway Park || 15,594 || 2–6 || L1
|- style="text-align:center; background-color:#fbb"
| 9 || April 12 || Indians || 1–3 || Nagy (2–0) || Sele (0–1) || Mesa (2) || Fenway Park || 26,703 || 2–7 || L2
|- style="text-align:center; background-color:#fbb"
| 10 || April 13 || Indians || 2–14 || Martínez (2–1) || Moyer (1–1) || — || Fenway Park || 31,827 || 2–8 || L3
|- style="text-align:center; background-color:#fbb"
| 11 || April 14 || Indians || 6–7 (11)|| Tavárez (1–1) || Stanton (0–1) || Mesa (2) || Fenway Park || 31,796 || 2–9 || L4
|- style="text-align:center; background-color:#fbb"
| 12 || April 15 || Indians || 0–8 || McDowell (1–1) || Wakefield (0–2) || — || Fenway Park || 32,861 || 2–10 || L5
|- style="text-align:center; background-color:#fbb"
| 13 || April 16 || @ Orioles || 1–6 || Wells (2–0) || Clemens (0–3) || — || Camden Yards || 40,017 || 2–11 || L6
|- style="text-align:center; background-color:#fbb"
| 14 || April 17 || @ Orioles || 5–6 (12)|| Rhodes (2–0) || Maddux (0–1) || — || Camden Yards || 40,258 || 2–12 || L7
|- style="text-align:center; background-color:#bfb;"
| 15 || April 18 || @ Orioles || 10–7 || Moyer (2–1) || Mussina (3–1) || Slocumb (2) || Camden Yards || 47,283 || 3–12 || W1
|- style="text-align:center; background-color:#fbb;"
| 16 || April 19 || @ Indians || 4–9 || Martínez (3–1) || Gordon (1–2) || — || Jacobs Field || 40,521 || 3–13 || L1
|- style="text-align:center; background-color:#fbb;"
| 17 || April 20 || @ Indians || 1–2 || McDowell (2–1) || Wakefield (0–3) || Mesa (4) || Jacobs Field || 40,498 || 3–14 || L2
|- style="text-align:center; background-color:#fbb;"
| 18 || April 21 || @ Indians || 7–11 || Ogea (1–0) || Pennington (0–2) || —  || Jacobs Field || 42,256 || 3–15 || L3
|- style="text-align:center; background-color:#bfb;"
| 19 || April 22 || @ Twins  || 4–1 || Sele (1–1) || Robertson (0–4) || Slocumb (3) || Metrodome || 11,340 || 4–15 || W1
|- style="text-align:center; background-color:#fbb;"
| 20 || April 23 || @ Twins || 6–8 || Naulty (1–0) || Hudson (0–1) || Stevens (5) || Metrodome || 11,533 || 4–16 || L1
|- style="text-align:center; background-color:#bfb;"
| 21 || April 24 || Rangers  || 11–9 || Stanton (1–1) || Heredia (0–2) || Slocumb (4) || Fenway Park || 19,217 || 5–16 || W1
|- style="text-align:center; background-color:#bfb;"
| 22 || April 25 || Rangers  || 8–3 || Wakefield (1–3) || Gross (3–2) || — || Fenway Park || 20,350 || 6–16 || W2
|- style="text-align:center; background-color:#fbb;"
| 23 || April 26 || Royals  || 3–4 || Belcher (2–1) || Clemens (0–4) || Montgomery (5) || Fenway Park || 22,385 || 6–17 || L1
|- style="text-align:center; background-color:#fbb;"
| 24 || April 27 || Royals  || 0–10 || Appier (2–3) || Sele (1–2) || — || Fenway Park || 29,459 || 6–18 || L2
|- style="text-align:center; background-color:#fbb;"
| 25 || April 28 || Royals  || 7–9 || Robinson (1–0) || Slocumb (0–1) || Montgomery (6) || Fenway Park || 32,491 || 7–18 || W1
|- style="text-align:center; background-color:#bfb;"
| 26 || April 30 || Tigers  || 13–4 || Wakefield (2–3) || Lima (0–1) || — || Fenway Park || 18,504 || 7–19 || L1
|-

|- style="text-align:center; background-color:#bfb"
| 27 || May 1 || Tigers || 5–1 || Clemens (1–4) || Aldred (0–3) || — || Fenway Park || 20,828 || 8–19 || W2
|- style="text-align:center; background-color:#bfb"
| 28 || May 3 || Blue Jays || 8–7 || Moyer (3–1) || Quantrill (0–4) || Slocumb (5) || Fenway Park || 25,570 || 9–19 || W3 
|- style="text-align:center; background-color:#bfb;"
| 29 || May 4 || Blue Jays || 8–4 || Gordon (2–2) || Viola (0–2) || Slocumb (6) || Fenway Park || 29,785 || 10–19 || W4
|- style="text-align:center; background-color:#fbb;"
| 30 || May 5 || Blue Jays || 4–11 || Hentgen (4–2) || Wakefield (2–4) || — || Fenway Park || 29,866 || 10–20 || L1
|- style="text-align:center; background-color:#bfb;"
| 31 || May 7 || @ Brewers || 4–2 || Clemens (2–4) || Miranda (1–2) || Slocumb (7) || Milwaukee County Stadium || 7,039 || 11–20 || W1 
|- style="text-align:center; background-color:#bbb"
| — || May 8 || @ Brewers  || colspan=8|Postponed (rain). Makeup date August 9.
|- style="text-align:center; background-color:#fbb;"
| 32 || May 9 || @ Brewers || 2–17 || Bones (2–5) || Sele (1–3) || — || Milwaukee County Stadium || 7,379 || 11–21 || L1 
|- style="text-align:center; background-color:#bfb;"
| 33 || May 10 || @ Blue Jays || 6–5 (11)|| Slocumb (1–1) || Carrara (0–1) || — || SkyDome || 31,159 || 12–21 || W1 
|- style="text-align:center; background-color:#fbb;"
| 34 || May 11 || @ Blue Jays || 8–9 (11)|| Quantrill (2–4) || Knackert (0–1) || — || SkyDome || 33,163 || 12–22 || L1 
|- style="text-align:center; background-color:#fbb;"
| 35 || May 12 || @ Blue Jays || 7–8 (10)|| Janzen (1–0) || Slocumb (1–2) || — || SkyDome || 31,188 || 12–23 || L2
|- style="text-align:center; background-color:#bfb;"
| 36 || May 14 || Angels || 4–3 (12)|| Belinda (1–1) || Boskie (4–1) || — || Fenway Park || 22,450 || 13–23 || W1 
|- style="text-align:center; background-color:#bfb;"
| 37 || May 15 || Angels || 17–6 || Moyer (4–1) || Grimsley (2–3) || — || Fenway Park || 23,455 || 14–23 || W2 
|- style="text-align:center; background-color:#bfb;"
| 38 || May 17 || Athletics || 5–3 (11)|| Stanton (2–1) || Van Poppel (0–4) || — || Fenway Park || 28,690 || 15–23 || W3 
|- style="text-align:center; background-color:#fbb"
| 39 || May 18 || Athletics || 5–6 (10)|| Groom (2–0) || Garcés (0–1) || Taylor (3) || Fenway Park || 31,663 || 15–24 || L1 
|- style="text-align:center; background-color:#bfb"
| 40 || May 19 || Athletics || 12–2 || Sele (2–3) || Wengert (1–2) || — || Fenway Park || 32,601 || 16–24 || W1 
|- style="text-align:center; background-color:#bfb"
| 41 || May 20 || Athletics || 16–4 || Gordon (3–2) || Johns (3–5) || — || Fenway Park || 20,890 || 17–24 || W2 
|- style="text-align:center; background-color:#fbb"
| 42 || May 21 || Mariners || 7–13 || Wells (3–1) || Eshelman (0–1) || — || Fenway Park || 24,528 || 17–25 || L1 
|- style="text-align:center; background-color:#fbb"
| 43 || May 22 || Mariners || 1–6 || Wolcott (3–5) || Wakefield (2–5) || — || Fenway Park || 26,753 || 17–26 || L2
|- style="text-align:center; background-color:#bfb"
| 44 || May 23 || Mariners || 11–4 || Clemens (3–4) || Milacki (1–1) || — || Fenway Park || 31,551 || 18–26 || W1
|- style="text-align:center; background-color:#fbb"
| 45 || May 24 || @ Angels || 1–3 || Finley (6–2) || Sele (2–4) || Percival (13) || Anaheim Stadium || 19,550 || 18–27 || L1 
|- style="text-align:center; background-color:#bfb;"
| 46 || May 25 || @ Angels || 10–3 || Gordon (4–2) || Williams (0–2) || — || Anaheim Stadium || 23,972 || 19–27 || W1 
|- style="text-align:center; background-color:#fbb;"
| 47 || May 26 || @ Angels || 2–12 || Boskie (6–1) || Eshelman (0–2) || — || Anaheim Stadium || 23,828 || 19–28 || L1 
|- style="text-align:center; background-color:#bfb;"
| 48 || May 27 || @ Athletics || 10–3 || Wakefield (3–5) || Wojciechowski (5–1) || — || Oakland-Alameda County Coliseum || 21,688 || 20–28 || W1 
|- style="text-align:center; background-color:#fbb"
| 49 || May 28 || @ Athletics || 2–6 || Wasdin (1–0) || Clemens (3–5) || — || Oakland-Alameda County Coliseum || 9,338 || 20–29 || L1 
|- style="text-align:center; background-color:#fbb"
| 50 || May 29 || @ Athletics || 6–7 (10)|| Mohler (3–0) || Slocumb (1–3) || — || Oakland-Alameda County Coliseum || 8,282 || 20–30 || L2 
|- style="text-align:center; background-color:#bfb"
| 51 || May 30 || @ Mariners || 10–1 || Gordon (5–2) || Torres (0–1) || — || Kingdome || 17,395 || 21–30 || W1 
|- style="text-align:center; background-color:#fbb"
| 52 || May 31 || @ Mariners || 6–9 || Wells (4–1) || Garcés (0–2) || — || Kingdome || 29,119 || 21–31 || L1 
|-

|- style="text-align:center; background-color:#bfb;"
| 53 || June 1 || @ Mariners || 6–5 || Wakefield (4–5) || Milacki (1–2) || Slocumb (8) || Kingdome || 34,822 || 22–31 || W1 
|- style="text-align:center; background-color:#fbb;"
| 54 || June 2 || @ Mariners || 1–2 || Wolcott (4–5) || Clemens (3–6) || Jackson (2) || Kingdome || 47,540 || 22–32 || L1
|- style="text-align:center; background-color:#fbb;"
| 55 || June 4 || White Sox || 4–6 || Álvarez (7–3) || Gunderson (0–1) || Hernández (17) || Fenway Park || 23,715 || 22–33 || L2
|- style="text-align:center; background-color:#fbb"
| 56 || June 5 || White Sox || 6–8 (12)|| Keyser (1–0) || Slocumb (1–4) ||— || Fenway Park || 24,246 || 22–34 || L3
|- style="text-align:center; background-color:#bfb"
| 57 || June 6 || White Sox || 7–4 || Eshelman (1–2) || Magrane (1–2) || Stanton (1) || Fenway Park || 24,382 || 23–34 || W1 
|- style="text-align:center; background-color:#bfb"
| 58 || June 7 || Brewers || 10–7 || Garcés (1–2) || García (1–2) || Slocumb (9) || Fenway Park || 26,861 || 24–34 || W2 
|- style="text-align:center; background-color:#fbb"
| 59 || June 8 || Brewers || 2–3 (10)|| Lloyd (2–2) || Hudson (0–2) || Fetters (10) || Fenway Park || 30,399 || 24–35 || L1
|- style="text-align:center; background-color:#fbb"
| 60 || June 9 || Brewers || 6–9 (10)|| Burrows (1–0) || Slocumb (1–5) || Fetters (11) || Fenway Park || 28,120 || 24–36 || L2 
|- style="text-align:center; background-color:#fbb"
| 61 || June 10 || @ White Sox || 2–8 || Tapani (7–3) || Wakefield (4–6) || — || Comiskey Park || 21,799 || 24–37 || L3
|- style="text-align:center; background-color:#bfb;"
| 62 || June 11 || @ White Sox || 9–2 || Eshelman (2–2) || Magrane (1–3) || — || Comiskey Park || 20,792 || 25–37 || W1
|- style="text-align:center; background-color:#bfb;"
| 63 || June 12 || @ White Sox || 3–2 (12)|| Hudson (1–2) || Karchner (5–1) || — || Comiskey Park || 21,139 || 26–37 || W2
|- style="text-align:center; background-color:#bfb;"
| 64 || June 13 || Rangers || 8–7 (10)|| Slocumb (2–5) || Henneman (0–4) || — || Fenway Park || 32,645 || 27–37 || W3
|- style="text-align:center; background-color:#bfb;"
| 65 || June 14 || Rangers || 4–3 || Stanton (3–1) || Witt (6–5) || — || Fenway Park || 29,689 || 28–37 || W4 
|- style="text-align:center; background-color:#fbb;"
| 66 || June 15 || Rangers || 3–13 || Gross (7–4) || Wakefield (4–7) || — || Fenway Park || 33,186 || 28–38 || L1
|- style="text-align:center; background-color:#bfb;"
| 67 || June 16 || Rangers || 10–9 || Hudson (2–2) || Henneman  (0–5) || — || Fenway Park || 30,461 || 29–38 || W1
|- style="text-align:center; background-color:#fbb;"
| 68 || June 18 || @ Indians || 7–9 || Swindell (1–3) || Sele (2–5) || Mesa (23) || Jacobs Field || 42,209 || 29–39 || L1
|- style="text-align:center; background-color:#fbb;"
| 69 || June 19 || @ Indians || 4–11 || Hershiser (7–4) || Gordon (5–3) || — || Jacobs Field || 42,276 || 29–40 || L2 
|- style="text-align:center; background-color:#fbb;"
| 70 || June 20 || @ Indians || 4–5 || Shuey (1–1) || Stanton (3–2) || — || Jacobs Field || 42,306 || 29–41 || L3
|- style="text-align:center; background-color:#fbb;"
| 71 || June 21 || @ Rangers || 4–14 || Hill (8–5) || Minchey (0–1) || — || The Ballpark in Arlington || 40,726 || 29–42 || L4
|- style="text-align:center; background-color:#fbb"
| 72 || June 22 || @ Rangers || 2–8 || Pavlik (10–1) || Wakefield (4–8) || — || The Ballpark in Arlington || 46,444 || 29–43 || L5
|- style="text-align:center; background-color:#bfb"
| 73 || June 23 || @ Rangers || 6–4 || Stanton (4–2) || Cook (3–1) || Slocumb (10) || The Ballpark in Arlington || 39,399 || 30–43 || W1 
|- style="text-align:center; background-color:#fbb"
| 74 || June 25 || Indians || 0–4 || Hershiser (8–4) || Gordon (5–4) || — || Fenway Park || 33,576 || 30–44 || L1
|- style="text-align:center; background-color:#bfb"
| 75 || June 26 || Indians || 6–4 (15)|| Garcés (2–2) || Embree (1–1) || — || Fenway Park || 33,727 || 31–44 || W1
|- style="text-align:center; background-color:#fbb"
| 76 || June 27 || Tigers || 6–9 || Lira (5–7) || Minchey (0–2) || — || Fenway Park || 29,582 || 31–45 || L1
|- style="text-align:center; background-color:#bfb"
| 77 || June 28 || Tigers || 8–5 || Wakefield (5–8) || Williams (1–5) || — || Fenway Park || 27,578 || 32–45 || W1
|- style="text-align:center; background-color:#bfb;"
| 78 || June 29 || Tigers || 13–6 || Eshelman (3–2) || Keagle (3–6) || — || Fenway Park || 33,509 || 33–45 || W2
|- style="text-align:center; background-color:#bfb;"
| 79 || June 30 || Tigers || 9–4 || Gordon (6–4) || Sodowsky (1–3) || — || Fenway Park || 31,217 || 34–45 || W3
|-

|- style="text-align:center; background-color:#fbb;"
| 80 || July 1 || @ Yankees || 0–2 || Key (4–6) || Clemens (3–7) || Wetteland (26) || Yankee Stadium || 27,734 || 34–46 || L1
|- style="text-align:center; background-color:#fbb"
| 81 || July 2 || @ Yankees || 5–7 || Nelson (3–2) || Hudson (2–3) || Wetteland (27) || Yankee Stadium || 28,310 || 34–47 || L2
|- style="text-align:center; background-color:#bbb"
| — || July 3 || @ Yankees  || colspan=8|Postponed (rain). Makeup date September 23.
|- style="text-align:center; background-color:#fbb"
| 82 || July 4 || @ Orioles  || 6–8 || Mussina (11–5) || Wakefield (5–9) || Myers (17) || Camden Yards || 47,075 || 34–48 || L3
|- style="text-align:center; background-color:#bfb"
| 83 || July 5 || @ Orioles  || 7–3 || Sele (3–5) || Wells (5–8) || — || Camden Yards || 47,237 || 35–48 || W1
|- style="text-align:center; background-color:#fbb;"
| 84 || July 6 || @ Orioles || 3–4 || Coppinger (4–0) || Clemens (3–8) || Myers (18) || Camden Yards || 47,500 || 35–49 || L1
|- style="text-align:center; background-color:#bfb;"
| 85 || July 7 || @ Orioles || 7–5 || Hudson (3–3) || Myers (0–2) || Slocumb (11) || Camden Yards || 47,532 || 36–49 || W1
|- style="text-align:center; background-color:#bfb;"
| 86 || July 11 || @ Tigers || 11–4 || Clemens (4–8) || Williams (2–6) || — || Tiger Stadium || 15,826 || 37–49 || W2
|- style="text-align:center; background-color:#bfb"
| 87 || July 12 || @ Tigers || 11–3 || Gordon (7–4) || Olivares (4–6) || — || Tiger Stadium || 19,535 || 38–49 || W3
|- style="text-align:center; background-color:#bfb"
| 88 || July 13 || @ Tigers || 10–5 || Sele (4–5) || Nitkowski (1–1) || — || Tiger Stadium || 16,671 || 39–49 || W4 
|- style="text-align:center; background-color:#bfb"
| 89 || July 14 || @ Tigers || 6–4 || Moyer (5–1) || Lira (6–8) || Slocumb (12) || Tiger Stadium || 19,670 || 40–49 || W5
|- style="text-align:center; background-color:#bfb"
| 90 || July 15 || Yankees  || 8–6 || Wakefield (6–9) || Hutton (0–1) || Slocumb (13) || Fenway Park || 33,263 || 41–49 || W6
|- style="text-align:center; background-color:#fbb"
| 91 || July 16 || Yankees || 5–9 || Key (7–6) || Clemens (4–9) || — || Fenway Park || 34,676 || 41–50 || L1
|- style="text-align:center; background-color:#bfb"
| 92 || July 17 || Yankees || 12–11 || Eshelman (4–2) || Wetteland (0–2) || — || Fenway Park || 34,082 || 42–50 || W1
|- style="text-align:center; background-color:#fbb"
| 93 || July 18 || Orioles || 3–6 || Wells (6–9) || Sele (4–6) || Myers (19) || Fenway Park || 33,014 || 42–51 || L1
|- style="text-align:center; background-color:#bfb;"
| 94 || July 19 || Orioles || 13–2 || Moyer (6–1) || Erickson (5–8) || — || Fenway Park || 32,262 || 43–51 || W1
|- style="text-align:center; background-color:#bfb;"
| 95 || July 20 || Orioles || 2–0 || Wakefield (7–9) || Coppinger (5–1) || Slocumb (14) || Fenway Park || 33,590 || 44–51 || W2
|- style="text-align:center; background-color:#fbb;"
| 96 || July 21 || Orioles || 6–10 (10)|| Myers (1–2) || Stanton (4–3) || — || Fenway Park || 34,432 || 44–52 || L1
|- style="text-align:center; background-color:#fbb;"
| 97 || July 22 || Royals || 2–5 || Belcher (9–5) || Gordon (7–5) || — || Fenway Park || 28,109 || 44–53 || L2
|- style="text-align:center; background-color:#fbb;"
| 98 || July 23 || Royals || 5–7 || Appier (9–7) || Sele (4–7) || — || Fenway Park || 23,711 || 44–54 || L3
|- style="text-align:center; background-color:#bfb"
| 99 || July 24 || Royals || 12–2 || Moyer (7–1) || Linton (4–6) || — || Fenway Park || 33,381 || 45–54 || W1
|- style="text-align:center; background-color:#fbb"
| 100 || July 25 || @ Twins || 6–16 || Parra (2–3) || Wakefield (7–10) || — || Metrodome || 13,924 || 45–55 || L1
|- style="text-align:center; background-color:#fbb"
| 101 || July 26 || @ Twins || 1–5 || Radke (6–13) || Clemens (4–10) || — || Metrodome || 17,768 || 45–56 || L2
|- style="text-align:center; background-color:#bfb"
| 102 || July 27 || @ Twins || 9–5 || Gordon (8–5) || Naulty (3–1) || — || Metrodome || 22,128 || 46–56 || W1
|- style="text-align:center; background-color:#fbb"
| 103 || July 28 || @ Twins || 8–9 || Aguilera (4–4) || Sele (4–8) || Naulty (4) || Metrodome || 17,448 || 46–57 || L1
|- style="text-align:center; background-color:#fbb"
| 104 || July 30 || @ Royals || 0–7 || Rosado (2–1) || Eshelman (4–3) || — || Kauffman Stadium || 17,166 || 46–58 || L2
|- style="text-align:center; background-color:#bfb"
| 105 || July 31 || @ Royals || 5–3 || Wakefield (8–10) || Haney (8–10) || Slocumb (15) || Kauffman Stadium || 17,527 || 47–58 || W1
|-

|- style="text-align:center; background-color:#fbb"
| 106 || August 1 || @ Royals || 4–9 || Belcher (10–6) || Clemens (4–11) || — || Kauffman Stadium || 18,934 || 47–59 || L1
|- style="text-align:center; background-color:#bfb"
| 107 || August 2 || Twins || 11–10 || Brandenburg (2–3) || Naulty (3–2) || — || Fenway Park || 28,041 || 48–59 || W1
|- style="text-align:center; background-color:#bfb"
| 108 || August 3 (1)|| Twins || 6–3 || Sele (5–8) || Rodriguez (10–9) || Hudson (1) || Fenway Park || 19,860 || 49–59 || W2
|- style="text-align:center; background-color:#fbb"
| 109 || August 3 (2)|| Twins || 0–6 || Aldred (5–7) || Suppan (0–1) || — || Fenway Park || 29,135 || 49–60 || L1
|- style="text-align:center; background-color:#bfb;"
| 110 || August 4 || Twins || 13–6 || Eshelman (5–3) || Klingenbeck (0–1) || — || Fenway Park || 29,939 || 50–60 || W1
|- style="text-align:center; background-color:#bfb;"
| 111 || August 5 || Blue Jays || 3–1 || Wakefield (9–10) || Guzmán (9–7) || — || Fenway Park || 23,884 || 51–60 || W2
|- style="text-align:center; background-color:#bfb;"
| 112 || August 6 || Blue Jays || 3–2 || Maddux (1–1) || Hanson (10–13) || Slocumb (16) || Fenway Park || 25,264 || 52–60 || W3
|- style="text-align:center; background-color:#bfb;"
| 113 || August 7 || Blue Jays || 8–0 || Gordon (9–5) || Hentgen (13–7) || — || Fenway Park || 30,443 || 53–60 || W4
|- style="text-align:center; background-color:#fbb;"
| 114 || August 8 || Blue Jays || 6–9 || Williams (1–0) || Sele (5–9) || Timlin (21) || Fenway Park || 32,696 || 53–61 || L1
|- style="text-align:center; background-color:#bfb;"
| 115 || August 9 (1)|| @ Brewers || 9–7 || Suppan (1–1) || Van Egmond (1–3) || Slocumb (17) || Milwaukee County Stadium || — || 54–61 || W1
|- style="text-align:center; background-color:#bfb;"
| 116 || August 9 (2)|| @ Brewers || 4–1 || Eshelman (6–3) || Bones (7–12) || Belinda (1) || Milwaukee County Stadium || 19,541 || 55–61 || W2
|- style="text-align:center; background-color:#bfb;"
| 117 || August 10 || @ Brewers || 3–2 || Wakefield (10–10) || Eldred (2–2) || — || Milwaukee County Stadium || 20,297 || 56–61 || W3
|- style="text-align:center; background-color:#bfb;"
| 118 || August 11 || @ Brewers || 2–0 || Clemens (5–11) || McDonald (10–7) || Belinda (2) || Milwaukee County Stadium || 19,178 || 57–61 || W4
|- style="text-align:center; background-color:#fbb"
| 119 || August 12 || @ Blue Jays || 1–5 || Hentgen (14–7) || Gordon (9–6) || — || SkyDome ||33,250 || 57–62 || L1
|- style="text-align:center; background-color:#bfb"
| 120 || August 13 || @ Blue Jays || 7–5 || Brandenburg (3–3) || Williams (1–1) || Slocumb (18) || SkyDome || 30,502 || 58–62 || W1
|- style="text-align:center; background-color:#bfb"
| 121 || August 14 || @ Blue Jays || 8–6 || Belinda (2–1) || Crabtree (5–3) || Slocumb (19) || SkyDome || 32,354 || 59–62 || W2
|- style="text-align:center; background-color:#fbb"
| 122 || August 16 || Angels || 3–6 || Springer (3–1) || Wakefield (10–11) || Percival (30) || Fenway Park || 30,693 || 59–63 || L1
|- style="text-align:center; background-color:#bfb"
| 123 || August 17 || Angels || 6–0 || Clemens (6–11) || Finley (11–12) || — || Fenway Park || 32,497 || 60–63 || W1
|- style="text-align:center; background-color:#fbb"
| 124 || August 18 || Angels || 3–4 || Holtz (2–2) || Brandenburg (3–4) || Percival (31) || Fenway Park || 25,224 || 60–64 || L1
|- style="text-align:center; background-color:#bfb"
| 125 || August 19 || Angels || 10–9 || Lacy (1–0) || Gohr (5–9) || Slocumb (20) || Fenway Park || 25,779 || 61–64 || W1
|- style="text-align:center; background-color:#bfb;"
| 126 || August 20 || Athletcs || 4–3 || Garcés (3–2) || Mohler (4–2) || Slocumb (21) || Fenway Park || 25,094 || 62–64 || W2
|- style="text-align:center; background-color:#bfb;"
| 127 || August 21 || Athletcs || 6–4 || Brandenburg (4–4) || Johns (6–12) || Slocumb (22) || Fenway Park || 26,362 || 63–64 || W3
|- style="text-align:center; background-color:#bfb;"
| 128 || August 22 || Athletcs || 2–1 || Clemens (7–11) || Acre (0–1) || — || Fenway Park || 30,503 || 64–64 || W4
|- style="text-align:center; background-color:#fbb"
| 129 || August 23 || Mariners || 4–6 || Bosio (4–3) || Brandenburg (4–5) || Ayala (2) || Fenway Park || 33,079 || 64–65 || L1
|- style="text-align:center; background-color:#bfb"
| 130 || August 24 || Mariners || 9–5 || Lacy (2–0) || Wells (11–6) || — || Fenway Park || 32,928 || 65–65 || W1
|- style="text-align:center; background-color:#bfb;"
| 131 || August 25 || Mariners || 8–5 || Maddux (2–1) || Wagner (3–5) || Slocumb (23) || Fenway Park || 34,377 || 66–65 || W2
|- style="text-align:center; background-color:#bfb;"
| 132 || August 26 || @ Angels || 4–1 || Wakefield (11–11) || Dickson (1–1) || — || Anaheim Stadium || 16,886 || 67–65 || W3
|- style="text-align:center; background-color:#bfb;"
| 133 || August 27 || @ Angels || 2–1 || Clemens (8–11) || Finley (12–13) || Slocumb (24) || Anaheim Stadium || 19,847 || 68–65 || W4
|- style="text-align:center; background-color:#bfb;"
| 134 || August 28 || @ Angels || 7–4 || Gordon (10–6) || Boskie (12–7) || — || Anaheim Stadium || 20,894 || 69–65 || W5
|- style="text-align:center; background-color:#fbb;"
| 135 || August 30 || @ Athletcs || 0–7 || Telgheder (2–5) || Maddux (2–2) || — ||Oakland-Alameda County Coliseum || 20,894 || 69–66 || L1
|- style="text-align:center; background-color:#fbb;"
| 136 || August 31 || @ Athletcs || 0–8 || Adams (2–2) || Wakefield (11–12) || — ||Oakland-Alameda County Coliseum || 32,116 || 69–67 || L2
|-

|- style="text-align:center; background-color:#bfb;"
| 137 || September 1 || @ Athletcs || 8–3 || Sele (6–9) || Wasdin (7–7) || — || Oakland-Alameda County Coliseum || 15,021 || 70–67 || W1
|- style="text-align:center; background-color:#bfb;"
| 138 || September 2 || @ Mariners || 9–8 (10)|| Slocumb (3–5) || Carmona (6–3) || — || Kingdome || 24,470 || 71–67 || W2
|- style="text-align:center; background-color:#fbb;"
| 139 || September 3 || @ Mariners || 9–11 || Torres (1–1) || Gordon (10–7) || Charlton (15) || Kingdome || 17,374 || 71–68 || L1
|- style="text-align:center; background-color:#bfb;"
| 140 || September 4 || @ Mariners || 8–5 || Mahomes (2–4) || Hitchcock (12–8) || Slocumb (25) || Kingdome || 22,642 || 72–68 || W1
|- style="text-align:center; background-color:#bfb;"
| 141 || September 6 || @ White Sox || 10–3 || Wakefield (12–12) || Álvarez (15–8) || — || Comiskey Park || 18,417 || 73–68 || W2
|- style="text-align:center; background-color:#fbb"
| 142 || September 7 || @ White Sox || 3–4 || Fernandez (13–9) || Clemens (8–12) || Hernández (36) || Comiskey Park || 28,219 ||73–69 || L1
|- style="text-align:center; background-color:#fbb"
| 143 || September 8 || @ White Sox || 4–7 || Baldwin (11–4) || Sele (6–10) || Hernández (37) || Comiskey Park || 19,983 || 73–70 || L2
|- style="text-align:center; background-color:#fbb"
| 144 || September 9 || Brewers || 0–6 || Karl (12–7) || Gordon (10–8) || — || Fenway Park || 22,386 || 73–71 || L3
|- style="text-align:center; background-color:#fbb"
| 145 || September 10 || Brewers || 10–11 || García (4–3) || Hudson (3–4) || Fetters (28) || Fenway Park || 20,487 || 73–72 || L4
|- style="text-align:center; background-color:#bfb"
| 146 || September 11 || Brewers || 4–1 || Wakefield (13–12) || Eldred (3–4) || Slocumb (26) || Fenway Park || 21,310 || 74–72 || W1
|- style="text-align:center; background-color:#bfb"
| 147 || September 13 || White Sox || 9–5 || Clemens (9–12) || Baldwin (11–5) || Slocumb (27) || Fenway Park || 28,907 || 75–72 || W2
|- style="text-align:center; background-color:#fbb"
| 148 || September 14 || White Sox || 5–13 || Castillo (4–3) || Gordon (10–9) || Simas (2) || Fenway Park || 31,481 || 75–73 || L1
|- style="text-align:center; background-color:#bfb"
| 149 || September 15 || White Sox || 9–8 || Slocumb (4–5) || Hernández (6–4) || — || Fenway Park || — || 76–73 || W1
|- style="text-align:center; background-color:#bfb"
| 150 || September 17 || @ Tigers  || 4–2 || Brandenburg (5–5) || Lira (6–14) || Slocumb (28) || Tiger Stadium || 8,180 || 77–73 || W2
|- style="text-align:center; background-color:#bfb;"
| 151 || September 18 || @ Tigers  || 4–0 || Clemens (10–12) || Thompson (1–6) || — || Tiger Stadium || 8,779 || 78–73 || W3
|- style="text-align:center; background-color:#bfb;"
| 152 || September 19 || @ Tigers || 8–3 || Gordon (11–8) || Miller (0–3) || — || Tiger Stadium || 7,666 || 79–73 || W4 
|- style="text-align:center; background-color:#bfb;"
| 153 || September 20 || @ Yankees || 4–2 || Wakefield (14–12) || Polley (1–2) || Slocumb (29) || Yankee Stadium || 39,883 || 80–73 || W5 
|- style="text-align:center; background-color:#fbb;"
| 154 || September 21 || @ Yankees  || 11–12 (10)|| Wetteland (2–3) || Hudson (3–5)  || — || Yankee Stadium || 54,599 || 80–74 || L1
|- style="text-align:center; background-color:#fbb;"
| 155 || September 22 || @ Yankees  || 3–4 || Rivera (8–3) || Sele (6–11) || Wetteland (42) || Yankee Stadium || 34,422 || 80–75 || L2
|- style="text-align:center; background-color:#bfb;"
| 156 || September 23 || @ Yankees  || 4–3 (11)|| Slocumb (5–5) || Boehringer (2–4) || Mahomes (1) || Yankee Stadium || 22,728 || 81–75 || W1
|- style="text-align:center; background-color:#bfb"
| 157 || September 24 || Orioles || 13–8 || Gordon (12–8) || Wells (11–14) || Mahomes (2) || Fenway Park || 28,557 || 82–75 || W2
|- style="text-align:center; background-color:#fbb"
| 158 || September 25 || Orioles || 2–6 || Krivda (3–5) || Wakefield (14–13) || Benítez (3) || Fenway Park || 28,432 || 82–76 || L1
|- style="text-align:center; background-color:#bfb"
| 159 || September 26 || Yankees || 5–3 || Maddux (3–2) || Key (12–11) || Slocumb (30) || Fenway Park || 32,367 || 83–76 || W1
|- style="text-align:center; background-color:#bfb"
| 160 || September 27 || Yankees || 7–5 || Sele (7–11) || Gooden (11–7) || Slocumb (31) || Fenway Park || 32,573 || 84–76 || W2
|- style="text-align:center; background-color:#fbb"
| 161 || September 28 || Yankees || 2–4 || Mendoza (4–5) || Clemens (10–13) || Wetteland (43) || Fenway Park || 33,612 || 84–77 || L1
|- style="text-align:center; background-color:#bfb"
| 162 || September 29 || Yankees || 6–5 || Mahomes (3–4) || Polley (1–3) || — || Fenway Park || 32,563 || 85–77 || W1
|-

|Reference:

Awards and honors 
 Mo Vaughn – AL Player of the Month (May)

All-Star Game
 Mo Vaughn, reserve 1B (started game)

Farm system 

The Lowell Spinners replaced the Utica Blue Sox as the Red Sox' Class A-Short Season affiliate.

The Red Sox shared a DSL team with the Houston Astros.

Source:

References

Further reading

External links 
 1996 Boston Red Sox team page at Baseball Reference
 1996 Boston Red Sox season at baseball-almanac.com

Boston Red Sox seasons
Boston Red Sox
Boston Red Sox
Red Sox